Kisa is a locality and the seat of Kinda Municipality, Östergötland County, Sweden with 3,687 inhabitants in 2010.

Actress Karin Inger Monica Nilsson, who starred as Pippi Longstocking in the 1969 TV series based on the book by Astrid Lindgren, was born here.
So was Met-Rx World Strongest Man 1998 winner, Magnus Samuelsson.

Sports
The following sports clubs are located in Kisa:

 Kisa BK

References 

Kinda Municipality
Populated places in Östergötland County
Populated places in Kinda Municipality
Municipal seats of Östergötland County
Swedish municipal seats